The gray gecko (Sphaerodactylus cinereus) is a species of lizard in the family Sphaerodactylidae . It is endemic to Haiti.

References

Sphaerodactylus
Reptiles of Haiti
Endemic fauna of Haiti
Reptiles described in 1830
Taxa named by Johann Georg Wagler